A dumbbell is a piece of equipment used in weight training.

Dumbbell may also refer to:
Dumbbells (film), a 2014 film
The Dumbbell Nebula is a planetary nebula (M27), which is shaped like a dumbbell
Physics: A p atomic orbital has the approximate shape of a pair of lobes on opposite sides of the nucleus, or a somewhat dumbbell shape
 The name "dumbbell tenement" was also used for the apartment buildings in the Lower East Side of New York City in the late 19th century 
 A "dumbbell interchange" is a type of road interchange
 Dumbbell interstitials, a type of crystal defect
DUMBBELLS, mnemonic for cholinergic overdose, also known as SLUDGE syndrome